The history of Washington includes thousands of years of Native American history before Europeans arrived and began to establish territorial claims. The region was part of Oregon Territory from 1848 to 1853, after which it was separated from Oregon and established as Washington Territory following the efforts at the Monticello Convention. On November 11, 1889, Washington became the 42nd state of the United States.

Prehistory and cultures 
Archaeological evidence shows that the Pacific Northwest was one of the first populated areas in North America. Both animal and human bones dating back to 13,000 years old have been found across Washington and evidence of human habitation in the Olympic Peninsula dates back to approximately 9,000 BCE, 3,000 to 5,000 years after massive flooding of the Columbia River which carved the Columbia Gorge.

Anthropologists estimate there were 125 distinct Northwest tribes and 50 languages and dialects in existence before the arrival of Euro-Americans in this region. Throughout the Puget Sound region, coastal tribes made use of the region's abundant natural resources, subsisting primarily on salmon, halibut, shellfish, and whale. Cedar was an important building material and was used by tribes to build both longhouses and large canoes. Clothing was also made from the bark of cedar trees. The Columbia River tribes became the richest of the Washington tribes through their control of Celilo Falls, historically the richest salmon fishing location in the Northwest. These falls on the Columbia River, east of present-day The Dalles, Oregon, were part of the path millions of salmon took to spawn. The presence of private wealth among the more aggressive coastal tribes encouraged gender divisions, as women took on prominent roles as traders and men participated in warring and captive-taking with other tribes. The eastern tribes, called the Plateau tribes, survived through seasonal hunting, fishing, and gathering. Tribal work among the Plateau Indians was also gender-divided, with both men and women responsible for equal parts of the food supply.

The principal tribes of the coastal areas include the Chinook, Lummi, Quinault, Makah, Quileute, and Snohomish. The Plateau tribes include the Klickitat, Cayuse, Nez Percé, Okanogan, Palouse, Spokane, Wenatchee, and Yakama. Today, Washington contains more than 20 Indian reservations, the largest of which is for the Yakama.

At Ozette, in the northwest corner of the state, an ancient village was covered by a mud slide, perhaps triggered by an earthquake about 500 years ago. More than 50,000 well-preserved artifacts have been found and cataloged, many of which are now on display at the Makah Cultural and Research Center in Neah Bay. Other sites have also revealed how long people have been there. Thumbnail-sized quartz knife blades found at the Hoko River site near Clallam Bay are believed to be 2,500 years old.

Colony

Early European and American exploration
The first European record of a landing on the Washington coast was in 1774 by Spaniard Juan Pérez. One year later, Spanish Captain Don Bruna de Heceta on board the Santiago, part of a two-ship flotilla with the Sonora, landed near the mouth of the Quinault River and claimed the coastal lands up to the Russian possessions in the north.

In 1778, the British explorer Captain James Cook sighted Cape Flattery, at the entrance to the Strait of Juan de Fuca. But the strait itself was not found until Charles William Barkley, captain of the Imperial Eagle, sighted it in 1787. Barkley named it for Juan de Fuca. The Spanish-British Nootka Conventions of the 1790s ended Spanish exclusivity and opened the Northwest Coast to explorers and traders from other nations, most important being Britain, Russia, and the United States. Further explorations of the straits were performed by Spanish explorers Manuel Quimper in 1790 and Francisco de Eliza in 1791 and then by British Captain George Vancouver in 1792. Captain Vancouver claimed the sound for Britain and named the waters south of the Tacoma Narrows Puget's Sound, in honor of Peter Puget, who was the lieutenant accompanying him on the Vancouver Expedition. The name later came to be used for the waters north of Tacoma Narrows as well. Vancouver and his expedition mapped the coast of Washington from 1792 to 1794.

Captain Robert Gray (for whom Grays Harbor County is named) discovered the mouth of the Columbia River in 1792, naming the river after his ship "Columbia" and later establishing a trade in sea otter pelts. The Lewis and Clark Expedition, under the direction of President Thomas Jefferson, entered the state from the east on October 10, 1805. Meriwether Lewis and William Clark were surprised by the differences in Indian tribes in the Pacific Northwest from those they had encountered earlier in the expedition, noting, in particular, the increased status of women among both coastal and plateau tribes. Lewis hypothesized that the equality of women and the elderly with men, was linked to more evenly distributed economic roles.

Canadian explorer David Thompson extensively explored the Columbia River commencing in 1807. In 1811, he became the first European to navigate the entire length of the river to the Pacific. Along the way he posted a notice where it joins the Snake River claiming the land for Britain and stating the intention of the North West Company to build a fort there. Subsequently, Fort Nez Perces trading post, was established near present-day Walla Walla, Washington. Thompson's notice was found by Astorians looking to establish an inland fur post. It contributed to David Stuart's choice, on behalf of the American Pacific Fur Company, of a more northerly site for their operations at Fort Okanogan.

By the time American settlers arrived in the 1830s, a population of Métis (mixed race) people had grown from centuries of early-European fur traders partnering with Native American women. Before Caucasian women began moving to the territory in the 1830s, traders and fur trade workers generally sought Métis or Native American women for wives. Early European-Indigenous mixed ancestry settlements resulted from these partnerships as outgrowth of the fur trade into agriculture: Cowlitz Prairie (Fort Vancouver) and Frenchtown
(Fort Nez Percés).

American–British occupation disputes

American interests in the region grew as part of the concept of manifest destiny. Spain ceded their rights north of the 42nd Parallel to the United States by the 1819 Adams-Onís Treaty, (but not possession, which was disallowed by the terms of the Nootka Conventions).

Britain had long-standing commercial interests through the Hudson's Bay Company and a well-established network of fur trading forts along the Columbia River in what it called Columbia District. These were headquartered from Fort Vancouver in present-day Vancouver, Washington.

By the Treaty of 1818, following from the War of 1812, Great Britain and the United States established the 49th parallel as the border west to the Continental Divide of the Rocky mountains; but agreed to joint control and occupancy of Oregon Country. In 1824, Russia signed an agreement with the U.S. acknowledging it had no claims south of 54-40 latitude north and Russia signed a similar treaty with Britain in 1825.

Joint occupancy was renewed, but on a year-to-year basis in 1827. Eventually, increased tension between U.S. settlers arriving by the Oregon trail and fur traders led to the Oregon boundary dispute. On June 15, 1846, Britain ceded its claims to the lands south of the 49th parallel, and the U.S. ceded its claims to the north of the same line, in the present day Canada–US border, in the Oregon Treaty.

In 1848, the Oregon Territory, composed of present-day Washington, Oregon, and Idaho as well as parts of Montana and Wyoming, was established. Washington Territory, which included Washington and pieces of Idaho and Montana, was formed from Oregon Territory in 1853. In 1872, An arbitration process settled the boundary dispute from the Pig War and established the US–Canada border through the San Juan Islands and Gulf Islands.

Early American Settlements

Eastern Washington
Settlements in the eastern part of the state were largely agricultural and focused around missionary establishments in the Walla Walla Valley. Missionaries attempted to 'civilize' the Indians, often in ways that disregarded or misunderstood native practices. When missionaries Dr. Marcus Whitman and Narcissa Whitman refused to leave their mission as racial tensions mounted in 1847, 13 American missionaries were killed by Cayuse and Umatilla Indians. Explanations of the 1847 Whitman massacre in Walla Walla include outbreaks of disease, resentment over harsh attempts at conversion of both religion and way of life, and contempt of the native Indians shown by the missionaries, particularly by Narcissa Whitman, the first white American woman in the Oregon Territory.

This event triggered the Cayuse War against the Indians, followed by the Yakima War, together with continuing until 1858.
The Provisional Legislature of Oregon in 1847 immediately raised companies of volunteers to go to war, if necessary, against the Cayuse, and, to the discontent of some of the militia leaders, also sent a peace commission. The United States Army later came to support the militia forces. These militia forces, eager for action, provoked both friendly and hostile Indians. In 1850, five Cayuse were convicted for murdering the Whitmans in 1847 and hanged. Sporadic bloodshed continued until 1855, when the Cayuse were decimated, defeated, bereft of their tribal lands, and placed on the Umatilla Indian Reservation in northeastern Oregon.

The conflicts over the possession of land between the Indians and the American settlers led the Americans in 1855, by the treaties at the Walla Walla Council, to coerce not only the Cayuse, but also the Walla Walla and the Umatilla tribes, to the Umatilla Indian Reservation in northeastern Oregon; fourteen other tribal groups to the Yakama Indian Reservation in southern Washington State; and the Nez Perce to a reservation in the border region of Washington, Oregon and Idaho. That same year, gold was discovered in the newly established Yakama reservation and white miners encroached upon these lands. The tribes - first the Yakama, eventually joined by the Walla Walla and the Cayuse - united together to fight the Americans in what is called the Yakima War. The U.S. Army sent troops and a number of raids and battles took place. In 1858, the Americans, at the Battle of Four Lakes, defeated the Indians decisively. In a newly imposed treaty, tribes were, again, confined to reservations.

Puget Sound
As American settlers moved west along the Oregon Trail, some traveled through the northern part of the Oregon Territory and settled in the Puget Sound area. The first European settlement in the Puget Sound area in the west of present-day Washington State came in 1833 at the British Hudson's Bay Company's Fort Nisqually, a farm and fur-trading post later operated by the Puget's Sound Agricultural Company (incorporated in 1840), a subsidiary of the Hudson's Bay Company. Washington's pioneer founder, Michael Simmons, along with the black pioneer George Washington Bush and his Caucasian wife, Isabella James Bush, from Missouri and Tennessee, respectively, led four white families into the territory and settled New Market, now known as Tumwater, in 1846. They settled in Washington to avoid Oregon's racist settlement-laws. After them, many more settlers, migrating overland along the Oregon trail, wandered north to settle in the Puget Sound area. In contrast with other American settlements in the West, there was comparatively little violence between settlers and Native Americans, though several exceptions, such as the extensive campaigns of Territorial Governor Isaac Ingalls Stevens (in office: 1853 to 1857) to force Indians into ceding lands and rights, are notable. The Puget Sound War of 1855-1856, the Cayuse War of 1847 to 1855, the Yakima War of 1855 to 1858, and the Spokane War of 1858 were the largest conflicts between the new American authorities and indigenous governments in the area. Raids by Haida,  Tlingit and other northern tribes from British and  Russian territory terrorized Native Americans and settlers alike in Puget Sound in the 1850s (note the events associated with Port Gamble in 1856-1857). Miners bound for the Fraser Canyon Gold Rush in British Columbia in 1858 using the Okanagan Trail traveled under arms, and many instances of violence occurred along the route.

Lumber industries drew settlers to the territory. Coastal cities, like  Seattle (founded in 1851 and originally called "Duwamps"), were established. Though wagon trains had previously carried entire families to the Oregon Territory, these early trading settlements were populated primarily with single young men. Liquor, gambling, and prostitution were ubiquitous, supported in Seattle by one of the city's founders, David Swinson "Doc" Maynard, who believed that well-run prostitution could be a functional part of the economy. The  Fraser Gold Rush in what would, as a result, become the Colony of British Columbia saw a flurry of settlement and merchant activity in northern Puget Sound which gave birth to Port Townsend (in 1851) and Whatcom (founded in 1858, later becoming  Bellingham) as commercial centres, at first attempting to rival  Victoria on Vancouver Island as a disembarkation point of the goldfields until the governor of the Colony of Vancouver Island ordered that all traffic to the Fraser River go via Victoria. Despite the limitation on goldfield-related commerce, many men who left the "Fraser River Humbug" (as the rush was for a while mis-named) settled in Whatcom and Island counties. Some of these were settlers on San Juan Island during the Pig War of 1859.

Upon the admission of the State of Oregon to the union in 1859, the eastern portions of the Oregon Territory, including southern Idaho, portions of Wyoming west of the continental divide (then Nebraska Territory), and a small portion of present-day Ravalli County, Montana were annexed to the Washington Territory. In 1863, the area of Washington Territory east of the Snake River and the 117th meridian west was reorganized as part of the newly-formed Idaho Territory, leaving that territory with only the lands within the current boundaries of the State of Washington.

Statehood

After the passage of the Enabling Act of 1889, Washington became the 42nd state in the United States on November 11, 1889. The proposed state constitution, passed by a four-to-one ratio, originally included women's suffrage and prohibition, but both of these issues were defeated and removed from the accepted constitution. Women had previously been given the vote in 1883 by the Washington Territorial Legislature, but the right was rescinded in 1887 by the Washington Territorial Supreme Court as a response to female support of prohibition. Despite these initial defeats, women in the Pacific Northwest received the right to vote earlier than the rest of the country, with Washington passing a suffrage amendment in 1910. Prohibition followed in 1916, two years before the rest of the nation.

Early prominent industries in the state included agriculture, lumber, and mining. In eastern Washington, Spokane was a major hub of mining activity and the Yakima Valley was known for its apple orchards and wheat fields. The heavy rainfall to the west of the Cascade Range produced dense forests and the ports along Puget Sound prospered from the manufacturing and shipping of lumber products, particularly the Douglas fir. In 1905, Washington State became the largest producer of lumber in the nation. Seattle was the primary port for trade with Alaska and for a time possessed a large shipbuilding industry. Other industries that developed in Washington include fishing, salmon canning, and mining. For an extended period of time, Tacoma was known for its large smelters where gold, silver, copper and lead ores were treated. The region around eastern Puget Sound developed heavy industry during the period including World War I and World War II and the Boeing Company became an established icon in the area.

Progressive Era
The progressive force of the early 20th century in Washington stemmed partially from the women's club movement which offered opportunities for leadership and political power to tens of thousands of women in the Pacific Northwest region.

1920s
Bertha Knight Landes was elected mayor of Seattle in 1926, the first woman mayor of a major city in the United States.

In 1924, Seattle's Sand Point Airfield was the endpoint of the first aerial circumnavigation of the world.

Great Depression
Vancouver became the endpoint for two ultra-long flights from Moscow, USSR over the North Pole. The first of these flights were performed by Valery Chkalov in 1937 on a Tupolev ANT-25RD airplane. Chkalov was originally scheduled to land at an airstrip in nearby Portland, Oregon but redirected at the last minute to Vancouver's Pearson Airfield.

During the depression era, a series of hydroelectric dams were constructed along the Columbia River as part of a project to increase the production of electricity. This culminated in 1941 with the completion of the Grand Coulee Dam, the largest in the United States.

World War II
During World War II, the Puget Sound area became a focus for war industries with the Boeing Company producing many of the nation's heavy bombers and ports in Seattle, Bremerton, Vancouver, and Tacoma available for the manufacturing of ships for the war effort. As the demand for labor and the number of young men drafted for service increased simultaneously, women entered the workforce in large numbers, recruited by local media. One-fourth of the laborers in shipyards were women, resulting in the installation of one of the first government-funded child-care centers in the workplace.

In eastern Washington, the Hanford Works nuclear power plant was opened in 1943 and played a major role in the construction of the nation's atomic bombs. One of the atomic bombs (nicknamed 'Fat Man' and dropped on Nagasaki, Japan on August 9, 1945) was fueled by Hanford plutonium and was transported in Boeing B-29s, also designed in Washington State.

Contemporary Washington

Eruption of Mount St Helens

On May 18, 1980, following a period of heavy tremors and eruptions, the northeast face of Mount St. Helens exploded outward, destroying a large part of the top of the volcano. This eruption flattened the forests for many miles, killed 57 people, flooded the Columbia River and its tributaries with ash and mud and blanketed large parts of Washington in ash, making day look like night.

Economy
Washington is well known for several prominent companies, the most notable of which are Microsoft, Amazon.com, Boeing, Nordstrom, The Bon Marché, Costco, and Starbucks. Monopolies have a long history in the state. Bill Boeing's namesake company grew from a small airplane company in 1916 to the national aircraft and airline conglomerate of Boeing and United Airlines, which was subsequently broken up by anti-trust regulators in 1934.

Politics
Politics in Washington have been generally Democratic since the 1950s and 60s and President John F. Kennedy's election. The state's system of blanket primaries, in which voters may vote for any candidate on the ballot and are not required to be affiliated with a particular political party, was ruled unconstitutional in 2003. The party-line primary system was instituted for the 2004 presidential and gubernatorial elections. In 2004, voters elected Governor Christine Gregoire into office, making Washington the first state to have a female governor and two female senators, Patty Murray and Maria Cantwell.

Protests against the World Trade Organization (WTO) in Seattle, sometimes referred to as the "Battle of Seattle", took place in 1999 when the WTO convened to discuss trade negotiations. Massive protests of at least 40,000 people included organizations such as NGOs involved in environment issues, labor unions, student groups, religious groups, and anarchists.

On January 30, 2006, Governor Christine Gregoire signed into law legislation making Washington the 17th state in the nation to protect gay and lesbian people from discrimination in housing, lending, and employment, and the 7th state in the nation to offer these protections to transgender people. Initiative activist Tim Eyman filed a referendum that same day, seeking to put the issue before the state's voters. In order to qualify for the November election, the measure required a minimum of 112,440 voter signatures by 5:00 p.m. June 6, 2006. Despite a push from conservative churches across the state to gather signatures on what were dubbed "Referendum Sundays," Eyman was only able to gather 105,103 signatures, more than 7,000 signatures short of the minimum. As a result, the law went into effect on June 7, 2006. The Washington legislature introduced more advanced converge of domestic partnerships in 2008.

See also

 Columbia District
 Historic regions of the United States
 History of the west coast of North America
 Oregon Country
 Oregon Territory
 Territorial evolution of Washington
 Timeline of Washington (state) history
 Washington Territory
 History of Seattle and Timeline of Seattle

References

External links

 Historylink.org, Online encyclopedia of Washington state history
University of Washington Libraries: Digital Collections:
Albert Henry Barnes Photographs 302 images from the turn of the 20th century documenting the landscape, people, and cities and towns of Western Washington.
Pacific Northwest Olympic Peninsula Community Museum A web-based museum showcasing aspects of the rich history and culture of Washington State's Olympic Peninsula communities. Features cultural exhibits, curriculum packets and a searchable archive of over 12,000 items that includes historical photographs, audio recordings, videos, maps, diaries, reports and other documents.
Prosch Washington Views Album 101 images (ca. 1858-1903) collected and annotated by Thomas Prosch, one of Seattle's earliest pioneers. Images document scenes in Eastern Washington especially Chelan and vicinity, and Seattle's early history including the Seattle Fire of 1889.
Washington State Localities Photographs Images (ca. 1880-1940) of Washington State, including forts and military installations, homesteads and residences, national parks and mountaineering, and industries and occupations, such as logging, mining and fishing.
Washington State Pioneer Life Database A collection of writings, diaries, letters, and reminiscences that recount the early settlement of Washington, the establishment of homesteads and towns and the hardships faced by many of the early pioneers.
Secretary of State's Washington History website
Classics in Washington History This digital collection of full-text books brings together rare, out of print titles for easy access by students, teachers, genealogists and historians. Visit Washington's early years through the lives of the men and women who lived and worked in Washington Territory and State.
Washington Historical Map Collection The State Archives and the State Library hold extensive map collections dealing with the Washington State and the surrounding region. Maps for this digital collection will be drawn from state and territorial government records, historic books, federal documents and the Northwest collection.
Washington Historical Newspapers
Washington Territorial Timeline To recognize the 150th anniversary of the birth of Washington, the State Archives has created a historical timeline of the Pacific Northwest and Washington Territory. With the help of pictures and documents from the State Archives, the timeline recounts the major political and social events that evolved Washington Territory into Washington State.
John M. Canse Pamphlet Collection This collection includes booklets, pamphlets, and maps that detail the development of the regions, towns, and cities of the Pacific Northwest, especially Washington State. 
Warren Wood Collection This collection includes the glass negatives, photographs and appointment notebooks of Warren Wood, pioneer surveyor of the Pacific Northwest.
 Spokane Historical, historical Spokane and Eastern Washington. 
 

 
Washington